Nicholas Papademetriou is an Australian actor of Greek Cypriot descent with many television, film and theatre credits. He is a graduate of Western Australian Academy of Performing Arts. He has had an extensive career in film and television since he graduated in 1984, but is best known as a stage actor, having appeared in productions in Australia, London, New York and Edinburgh.

Early life

The son of Greek Cypriot immigrant parents, he grew up in the Inner West Sydney suburb of Hurlstone Park, and graduated from secondary school at the select school Canterbury Boys' High School. Fulfilling the long term desire of acting was stalled by his strict Greek-Cypriot upbringing, and in the years between leaving school and attending WAAPA, Nicholas had a varied career in travel working as a tour guide in Greece, travel consultant in both Sydney and London, flight attendant for Qantas and numerous posts in hospitality. It was not until late 1981 that he auditioned for WAAPA and was accepted into what would be the first acting year to go through the college in 1982.

Television
Papademetriou began his acting career in the television soap opera Sons and Daughters as Nikos Dimitriou. This was followed by many television roles in such series as Water Rats, G.P. and All Saints. He had a recurring role in Home & Away in 1988 as Nico Pappas. He returned to the show in another role as Con Poulos in 2001–2002. He had a regular role in both seasons of the ABC series Grass Roots as Victor Trujillo He was also the Australian lead in the Australian Broadcasting Corporation series 'Stringer'. He has  had guest roles in most Australian series including Water Rats, Tough Nuts: Australia's Hardest Criminals, The Surgeon and Tricky Business. In 2009, he appeared in several episodes of the children's television series My Place. In the series Gangs of Oz he played Graham 'Abo' Henry. Other mini-series include Cyclone Tracy, Jessica (TV miniseries), A Difficult Woman and Stark (TV miniseries) by Ben Elton.

Theatre
He is primarily known as a theatre actor and has worked for most of the major theatre companies in Australia including Melbourne Theatre Company, Sydney Theatre Company and Company B Belvoir. In 1989 he worked for Mike Leigh in Greek Tragedy which played in London and Edinburgh. His one-man show 'SNAG' has played around Australia, in New York and Edinburgh. He was also in the Australian national tour of '12 Angry Men'. Papademetriou has also directed a number of successful productions including 'And Miss Reardon Drinks A Little,'  Lady Windermere's Fan, Anna in the Tropics. In 2010 he created the role of Nikos Nomikos in the world premiere of "The Swimming Club" by Hannie Rayson for Melbourne Theatre Company. In the same year he played Sorin in The Seagull and directed The Importance of Being Earnest in which he also played Canon Chasuble. In 2012 he played the lead role of Sandy Sonnenberg in the Australian premiere of The Paris Letter by Jon Robin Baitz. In 2013 he appeared in Rosencrantz & Guildenstern are Dead at the Sydney Theatre Company and played Ludovico, Brabantio and Montano in Othello for independent theatre company Sport For Jove. In 2014 he created a new role in the world premiere of Aiden Fennessey's new play for two actors called "The Way Things Work" for the Tamarama Rock Surfers and directed by Leland Keen. His theatre work continues with regular appearances in independent productions including most recently as George in Who's Afraid of Virginia Woolf for theatrongroup. In February 2017 he appeared as Howard in the Australian premiere of The Mystery Of Love & Sex by Bathsheba Doran at Sydney's Eternity Theatre. He appeared as Vinnie in The Odd Couple at The Ensemble Theatre  and his performance was considered 'brilliant' by theatre critics including The Sydney Morning Herald

Film
Papademetriou has had many roles in films such as Mission: Impossible 2, The Night We Called It a Day and Death in Brunswick. He has also appeared in a number of award-winning short films including Two Nights, In 2013 he wrote and directed a short film Swinger.  The film has been selected in competition at a number of international film festivals including the Cyprus International Film Festival and The San Pedro International Film Festival.

References

External links

Australian male film actors
Australian male soap opera actors
Living people
Male actors from Sydney
Australian people of Greek Cypriot descent
Australian people of Greek descent
Australian male stage actors
Year of birth missing (living people)